Mónica Xóchitl Dionne Lazo (born February 7, 1967) is an American actress born in Waterbury, Connecticut.  She is of Mexican descent.  Dionne is best known for her roles in telenovelas produced by TV Azteca. She also acted in movies such as Sexo, pudor y lágrimas where she played the role of "María".

In 2007 she played the role of Flavia Portillo de Cisneros in the telenovela Madre Luna.

References

External links

1967 births
American actresses of Mexican descent
American film actresses
American television actresses
Actresses from Connecticut
Living people
21st-century American women